Whitby Transit was a public transit agency in the Town of Whitby, Ontario, Canada from 1980 to 2006. It was merged with the other public transit agencies in Durham Region on January 1, 2006 to form Durham Region Transit.

History
Previous transit operators include:
 Charterways Transportation Limited

In 1980 the system was transferred to town ownership with operations contracted to Charterways Transportation.

Operations

WT routes were:

References

External links
 Drawings and photos of Whitby buses

Transit agencies in Ontario
Transport in Whitby, Ontario
History of transport in the Regional Municipality of Durham